Severe achondroplasia with developmental delay and acanthosis nigricans (SADDAN) is a very rare genetic disorder. This disorder is one that affects bone growth and is characterized by skeletal, brain, and skin abnormalities. Those affected by the disorder are severely short in height and commonly possess shorter arms and legs. In addition, the bones of the legs are often bowed and the affected have smaller chests with shorter rib bones, along with curved collarbones. Other symptoms of the disorder include broad fingers and extra folds of skin on the arms and legs. Developmentally, many individuals who suffer from the disorder show a higher level in delays and disability. Seizures are also common due to structural abnormalities of the brain. Those affected may also suffer with apnea, the slowing or loss of breath for short periods of time.

Many of the features of SADDAN are similar to those seen in other skeletal disorders, specifically achondroplasia and thanatophoric dysplasia.
Achondroplasia is a form of short-limbed dwarfism. This type of dwarfism is caused by the inability of the cartilage of the skeleton to ossify and turn to bone. Acanthosis nigricans is a skin condition in which areas of the skin is of a dark and velvety discoloration, often seen in the body folds and creases such as the armpits, groin, and neck. Within those affected by SADDAN, acanthosis nigricans develops early on, usually in infancy or early childhood.

Genetic

The mutated gene responsible for the disorder is the FGFR3 gene, more specifically; a Lys650Met missense mutation of the FGFR3 gene is what causes SADDAN. This gene codes for the instructions of a protein that is integral in the development and maintenance of bone and brain tissue. Mutations of this gene cause the protein to be overly active, causing many characteristics of this disorder.

SADDAN is an autosomal dominant genetic disorder. Autosomal means that the gene responsible for the mutation and disorder is found on a non-sex chromosome and that either the mother or father can pass on the gene, while dominant means that only one copy of the gene is required for the individual to have the disorder.

The disorder is very rare and has only been described in a few number of cases worldwide. While the disorder can be genetically inherited, no instances of inheritance have been recorded as of yet. Rather, of the few cases documented, the individual affected by the disorder is affected as a product of a random mutation, also called a de novo mutation, of the FGFR3 gene only, not by inheritance of the mutated gene.

Diagnosis

Medical diagnosis is required. Clinical tests can be performed, as well as molecular genetic testing. The available tests include:

Sequence analysis of the entire coding region
 Severe achondroplasia with developmental delay and acanthosis nigricans (SADDAN) - Sanger Sequencing: Diagnosis, Mutation Confirmation, Pre-symptomatic, Risk Assessment, Screening
 Craniosynostosis: Diagnosis
 Invitae FGFR3-Related Disorders Test: Pre-symptomatic, Diagnosis, Therapeutic management

Mutation scanning of select exons
 Skeletal Dysplasia Panel: Diagnosis, Prognostic

Sequence analysis of select exons
 Severe Achondroplasia with Developmental Delay and Acanthosis Nigricans (SADDAN, FGFR3): Diagnosis, Mutation Confirmation, Risk Assessment
 Severe Achondroplasia, Developmental Delay, Acanthosis Nigricans: Diagnosis, Mutation Confirmation

Deletion/duplication analysis
 Invitae FGFR3-Related Disorders Test: Pre-symptomatic, Diagnosis, Therapeutic management

Management
Life with SADDAN is manageable, although therapy, surgery, and lifelong doctor surveillance may be required.

References

External links 

Genetic diseases and disorders
Rare diseases